John Dean Travis (October 8, 1940 – April 21, 2016) was an American politician.

Travis was born in Clinton, Louisiana. He lived in Jackson, Louisiana and was a finance manager. Travis served on the East Feliciana Parish School Board and on the Jackson Town Board. Travis served in the Louisiana House of Representatives from 1984 to 2000 and was a Democrat. Travis served as the Louisiana Commissioner of the Office of Financial Institutions. He died at Baton Rouge General Hospital in Baton Rouge, Louisiana.

Notes

1940 births
2016 deaths
People from Clinton, Louisiana
People from Jackson, Louisiana
Businesspeople from Louisiana
Louisiana city council members
School board members in Louisiana
Democratic Party members of the Louisiana House of Representatives
20th-century American businesspeople